The Valley of the Giants is a  forest preserve owned and managed by the Bureau of Land Management and is located in a remote portion of the Oregon Coast Range of Northwest Oregon in the United States, near the former company town of Valsetz. A famous specimen is "Big Guy" which at one time was the second largest Douglas-fir known standing in Oregon.

Valley of the Giants Trailhead 

In 1976, the Bureau of Land Management designated the site as an Outstanding Natural Area. Visitors are encouraged to call BLM's Salem District Office at 503-375-5646 for directions and road information.

As of June 6, 2008, the Oregon Heritage Tree Program dedicated the Valley of the Giants Outstanding Natural Area as a Heritage Tree Grove.

References 

Forests of Oregon
Geography of Polk County, Oregon
Bureau of Land Management areas in Oregon
Protected areas of Polk County, Oregon
Nature reserves in Oregon
Protected areas established in 1976
1976 establishments in Oregon